Diamond Simpson (born April 28, 1993) is a Canadian soccer player who plays as a defender. She made four appearances for the Canada national team.

Early life
She began playing youth soccer at age 8 with North Mississauga SC, later playing with Dixie SC.

College career
From 2012 to 2015, she played college soccer for the Memphis Tigers of the University of Memphis. She scored her first goal on September 6, 2012, scoring the overtime winner against the Vanderbilt Commodores, earning her Conference USA Offensive Player of the Week honours. In 2012, she was named to the NSCAA All-Central Region second team, All-Conference USA second team, and C-USA All-Freshman Team. In her sophomore season, she was named to the American Athletic Conference second team and the NSCAA All-Northeast Third Team. In 2014, she was named to the All-American Athletic Conference First Team and NSCAA All-Region Second Team.

Club career
In 2010, she began playing with Hamilton FC Rage (later became K-W United) in the USL W-League.

In 2015 and 2016, she played with Woodbridge Strikers in League1 Ontario. In 2016, she was named a league First-Team All Star.

In 2017, she played with Toronto Azzurri Blizzard. She was named the league's Defender of the Year as well as a First Team All Star.

In 2018 and 2019, she played for Woodbridge Strikers once again. On July 14, 2018, she scored two goals in two minutes to lead Woodbridge to a 3-1 victory over Durham United FA. In 2018 and 2019, she was once again named against named Defender of the Year, for the second and third times, as well as First Team All Star Selections for the third and fourth consecutive times. In 2020, she was named to the League1 Ontario Women's All-Time Best XI.

International career
Simpson won a bronze medal with the Canada U17 at the 2008 CONCACAF Women's U-17 Championship and also reached the quarter-finals with Canada at the 2008 FIFA U-17 Women's World Cup. She won a gold medal at the 2010 CONCACAF Women's U-17 Championship, where she scored her first goal on March 13, 2010 in a 2-1 victory over Panama U17. She won a silver medal with Canada at the 2012 CONCACAF Women's U-20 Championship.

She made her debut for the Canada senior team on December 9, 2010 against the Netherlands. She won a gold medal with Canada at the 2011 Pan American Games.

In 2010, she was named the Canadian Women's U-17 Player of the Year.

Honours
Club
League1 Ontario League Cup: 2018

International
CONCACAF Women's U-17 Championship
Gold: 2010
Silver: 2008

CONCACAF Women's U-20 Championship
Silver: 2012

Pan American Games
Gold: 2011
Individual
League1 Ontario Defender of the Year: 2017, 2018, 2019
League1 Ontario First Team All-Star: 2016, 2017, 2018, 2019
USL W-League All Central Conference Team: 2013

References

External links
 
 Memphis Tigers profile

1993 births
Living people
Canada women's international soccer players
Canadian women's soccer players
Soccer players from Toronto
Sportspeople from Scarborough, Toronto
Women's association football defenders
Woodbridge Strikers (women) players
North Mississauga SC (women) players
League1 Ontario (women) players
Memphis Tigers women's soccer players
Canadian people of Trinidad and Tobago descent
Pan American Games medalists in football
Pan American Games gold medalists for Canada
Medalists at the 2011 Pan American Games
Footballers at the 2011 Pan American Games